Around seven Tanzanian sign languages were developed independently among deaf students in separate Tanzanian schools for the deaf starting in 1963, though use of several are forbidden by their schools. In 1984, a standardized Tanzanian Sign Language was proposed by the Tanzania Association for the Deaf, using common or similar signs where these exist in the schools which allowed research, but it has not been officially implemented, and there remains little influence between the languages. A dictionary has been produced. Lexically, the variety that developed in the oralist deaf school in Tabora is significantly different from the dictionary, and is under investigation.

The common Swahili term in Tanzania for these languages is lugha ya alama (ya Tanzania), lit. '(Tanzanian) sign language'. The term lugha ya bubu 'mute/dumb language' is also used, but is pejorative and offensive.

References

Sign language isolates
Languages of Tanzania
Endangered sign language isolates